Jongikhaya Lutric Nokwe (born 30 December 1981) is a South African former rugby union player who played as a winger.

Playing career
Nokwe made his international debut against Argentina on 9 August 2008 and scored a try as the Springboks won 63–9. In only his third game, he became the first Springbok player to score four tries against the Wallabies in a test match in a 53–8 victory at Ellis Park Stadium, Johannesburg before injuring his leg.

The following year he was selected in the South Africa squad to play the British and Irish Lions and started the final test as the Springboks won the series 2–1.

In 2005 Nokwe was named South African Young Player of the Year ahead of future Springboks Morné Steyn, Wynand Olivier, Ruan Pienaar and JP Pietersen.

In 2006 he was named Provincial Sportsman of the Year by the Department of Cultural Affairs and Sport in the Western Cape.

Test history

Coaching career
After his retirement, Nokwe started coaching and he was appointed assistant coach of the  women team. During September 2017, Nokwe was appointed coach of the SA Select Women's Sevens team for the Hokkaido Invitational Sevens in Japan.

See also
List of South Africa national rugby union players – Springbok no. 767

References

External links
 

1981 births
Living people
People from Amahlathi Local Municipality
Xhosa people
Rugby union wings
Eastern Province Elephants players
South African rugby union players
South Africa international rugby union players
Cheetahs (rugby union) players
Free State Cheetahs players
Stormers players
Boland Cavaliers players
Griffons (rugby union) players
Falcons (rugby union) players
South Africa international rugby sevens players
Rugby union players from the Eastern Cape